Hollywood Exes is a 2012-2014 American reality television series that aired for three seasons on VH1. The series chronicles the lives of seven ex-wives of famous men. The series led to one spin-off, Atlanta Exes, which ran for one season in 2014.

Production
In September 2012, VH1 announced that Hollywood Exes had been renewed for a second season with Daphne Wayans joining the cast. The second season premiered on July 8, 2013.

In January 2014, VH1 announced that the third season would premiere on May 7, 2014, with Shanna Moakler joining the cast. The spin-off show of the series, Atlanta Exes, premiered on August 18, 2014.

On October 22, 2020, it was announced that a reunion special titled Hollywood Exes: Reunited will premiere on November 24, 2020.

Cast

 Nicole Murphy (season 1–3), ex-wife of comedian/actor Eddie Murphy, engaged to retired NFL and television personality Michael Strahan;
 Mayte Garcia (season 1–3), ex-wife of pop star Prince;
 Jessica Canseco (season 1–3), ex-wife of former baseball player Jose Canseco;
 Sheree Fletcher (season 1–3), ex-wife of actor and rapper Will Smith; then-wife to retired NFL player Terrell Fletcher
 Andrea Kelly (season 1–3), ex-wife of R&B singer R. Kelly;
 Shamicka Lawrence (season 2–3), ex-wife of comedian/actor Martin Lawrence;
 Shanna Moakler (season 3), ex-wife of musician Travis Barker.

Recurring
 Josie Canseco, daughter of Jessica and Jose Canseco;
 Jose Canseco, former baseball player and Jessica's ex-husband;
 Terrell Fletcher, former NFL player turned pastor and Sheree's then-husband.
 Daphne Wayans (Season 2), friend of the ladies and ex-wife of Keenen Ivory Wayans

Episodes

Season 1 (2012)

Season 2 (2013)

Season 3 (2014)

Reception
Zap2it's Elizabeth Brady described the cast as "sympathetic and agreeable" finding it "refreshing to see that there might be a place for women who play nice every now and then in reality TV." She added that "Hollywood Exes is certainly not the most compelling series of the summer, but it has its moments."

References

External links
 
 

2010s American reality television series
2012 American television series debuts
English-language television shows
Television shows set in Los Angeles
VH1 original programming
2014 American television series endings
Women in California